Krešimir "Krešo" Ćosić (26 November 1948 – 25 May 1995) was a Croatian-Yugoslavian professional basketball player and coach. He was a collegiate All-American at Brigham Young University. He revolutionized basketball in Yugoslavia and was the first basketball player in the world to play all five positions.

In 1996, Ćosić became only the third international player ever elected to the Naismith Memorial Basketball Hall of Fame (the second male player). He is one of 62 people in the world that received the FIBA Order of Merit. In 2006, he was inducted into the College Basketball Hall of Fame, and in 2007, he was also an inaugural member of the FIBA Hall of Fame. The Croatian Basketball Cup, and KK Zadar's home arena, are named after him. Ćosić was voted best Croatian athlete of the 20th century twice; by Croatian Sports News and by Croatian National Television. 

Ćosić was a notable church leader and missionary of the Church of Jesus Christ of Latter-day Saints, as well as the deputy ambassador of Croatia to the U.S., in Washington, D.C.

Early club career
Ćosić was born in Zagreb, SR Croatia, on 26 November 1948, to Ante and Darinka Ćosić. He was raised in Zadar, and in 1965, he started his club basketball playing career, by playing with KK Zadar. While with Zadar, he won three Yugoslav League titles: in 1965, 1967, and 1968.'College career and NBA draft
In the summer of 1968, Ćosić was in a European team with Finnish player Veikko Vainio. Vainio, a student at Brigham Young University (BYU), told him about life in college, and invited him to play for the BYU Cougars. Ćosić accepted this invitation, and moved to the United States, in 1969. In his freshman year, he played in 12 games for the freshman team, averaging 17.4 points and 12.6 rebounds per game. In his sophomore year, he averaged 15.1 points and 12.6 rebounds per game, leading BYU to the 1971 WAC Championship.

In his junior year, he again led his team to the WAC Championship, averaging 22.3 points and 12.8 rebounds per game, and being awarded All-American honors by the United Press International, making him the first non-American player to achieve that. In the 1972 NBA draft, he was picked by the Portland Trail Blazers, in the 10th round (144th overall), but he opted to stay with BYU.

As a senior, he averaged 20.2 points and 9.5 rebounds per game, and again was given All-American honors, by the United Press International. His career college basketball averages were 18.9 points, and 11.8 rebounds per game.

The Marriott Center, at BYU, was built during Ćosić's career at BYU, the Smith Field House could not hold in all fans so there is a saying about the Marriott Center – Stan Watts built it, Marriott paid for it, and Krešo filled it.

Late club career
At the 1973 NBA draft, Ćosić was picked by the Los Angeles Lakers, in the 5th round (84th overall). He rejected several professional offers from the NBA and ABA, and returned home to Croatia, where he again played with KK Zadar, from 1973 to 1976. He was responsible for bringing the first American to play for a Yugoslav club team. He brought Doug Richards to Zadar.

After that, he played with AŠK Olimpija (1976–1978), with Virtus Bologna (1978–1980), and with Cibona Zagreb (1980–1983). Ćosić helped lead Cibona to their first European Cup.

National team career
Ćosić made his national team debut for Yugoslavia, at the age of 17, after being called up to the senior team by head coach Ranko Žeravica. He won a silver medal at the 1967 FIBA World Championship. At the 1968 Summer Olympics, he won another silver medal.

Ćosić holds the record for playing the most games for a national team (303) and was part of three generations and holds the most basketball awards/medals in Croatia. In total, Ćosić played in four Summer Olympic Games: 1968, 1972, 1976, and 1980 in Moscow, when he led his team as captain to the gold medal. He previously had led Yugoslavia to a pair of FIBA World Cup gold medals, at the 1970 FIBA World Championship, and at the 1978 FIBA World Championship.

Coaching career
He first coached the Zadar team upon returning from BYU in 1973. However, he found it too exhausting being a coach, club director and player. In 1976 he coached the Ljubljana Brest team and was at the same time a player for Zadar (both teams played in the same league).
Following his playing days, Ćosić returned to coaching, and he led the senior Yugoslav national team to a silver medal at the 1988 Summer Olympics in Seoul, and to bronze medals at the 1986 FIBA World Championship, and the 1987 EuroBasket. Even though no one agreed with him, Ćosić insisted on including young players in the national team and was the first to give them a chance, they included: Dino Rađa, Vlade Divac, Toni Kukoč.

He also recognized a young talent in Dejan Bodiroga, whom he helped set off his career.

 Off the court 
 Diplomacy  
Ćosić turned down coaching offers so that he could help Croatia during war-time in the early 90's. He was positioned in the Embassy of Croatia to the USA, as the deputy ambassador in Washington D.C. He was the only person at the time able to help in fixing misconceptions about the war. His strong connections helped Croatia and he received the Freedom Award for contributing to advancing peace and reconciliation to all ethnic groups in Croatia.

 Church life  
During his time at Brigham Young University, Ćosić converted to the Church of Jesus Christ of Latter-day Saints, and he later served as the LDS presiding priesthood holder, in post-communist Croatia. He was baptized by Hugh Nibley, one of the LDS church's most celebrated scholars. Ćosić also introduced the LDS Church to the former Yugoslavia. He translated the Book of Mormon and Doctrine and Covenants, into Croatian. According to Nibley, Ćosić told him, "There are a hundred reasons why I should not join the Church, and only one reason why I should - because it is true."

 Writer 
Ćosić was known to carry a suitcase full of books wherever he traveled. He was an atypical athlete, reading, analyzing and noting. He always had the latest gadget at hand and was obsessed with technology. He listened to classical music and loved the theatre and arts. In the 80's he started writing his autobiography which was never completed. His daughter, Ana, published his writings in May 2019 in Croatian under the book name Play, Believe, Live. The book gives an inside view of Ćosić's sports career and his theories about sports in general.

 Death 

In the years following his career in basketball, Ćosić worked in the United States, as a Croatian diplomat, at the embassy in Washington, D.C., having helped secure the land where the embassy now stands. Ćosić died in Baltimore, Maryland, in 1995, of non-Hodgkin's lymphoma. He was buried in the Mirogoj Cemetery, under the Arcades, in Zagreb, Croatia. People came from all over former Yugoslavia to his funeral, even though there was a war at the time. He was survived by his wife, Ljerka, his two daughters, and his son, Krešimir.

 Honors 
The Croatian national basketball cup and KK Zadar's home arena are named after him.
He was a 6× participant of FIBA All-Star Games, playing on the side of European Selection roster.
He is one of top medalists of the FIBA World Cup, with 4 medals.
He was named the FIBA EuroBasket MVP, in 1971 and 1975.
He was named the Croatian Sportsmen of the Year, in 1980.
He was inducted into the BYU Hall of Fame, in 1983.
He was named one of FIBA's 50 Greatest Players, in 1991.
He received the Freedom Award, in Utah, 1993.
He was awarded the FIBA Order of Merit, in 1994.
He was enshrined into the Basketball Hall of Fame, in 1996.
He was inducted into Utah Basketball Hall of Fame, in 2001.
He was awarded with the Croatian Lifetime Achievement in Sport, in 2002.
On 4 March 2006, Ćosić became just the second men's basketball player to have his jersey retired by BYU (the other was Danny Ainge).
In 2006, he was enshrined into the College Basketball Hall of Fame.
In 2007, he was enshrined into the FIBA Hall of Fame.
He was named one of the 50 Greatest EuroLeague Contributors, in 2008.

Landmarks
The Croatian landmark formerly known as Califfi Castle now bears his name in his honor.
The Krešimir Ćosić sports arena in Zadar, the most versatile sports hall in Croatia.
There is a statue looking at the Krešimir Ćosić sports arena in Zadar.
There is a square in Zagreb, Croatia that bears his name (Trg Krešimira Ćosića).
There is a street in Zadar that bears his name.
There is a street in Vukovar that bears his name.
There is a street in Dobropoljana, Island Pasman that bears his name.
There is a memorial basket in Zadar where he started his basketball career as a child.

See also
Yugoslav First Federal Basketball League career stats leaders

 References 

 External links 

Krešimir Ćosić BYU Profile
Todd Bluth. "Former BYU All-American's Jersey Retired", The Daily Universe'' (byu.edu), 6 March 2006
Krešimir Ćosić Profile, Basketball Hall of Fame Web Page

Krešimir Ćosić Profile, Fibaeurope.com 
Krešimir Ćosić Player Profile, legabasket.it 
Krešimir Ćosić Coach Profile, legabasket.it 
Krešimir Ćosić Profile, interbasket.net 
FIBA Hall of Fame Page on Krešimir Ćosić, halloffame.fiba.com
Krešimir Ćosić: An Off-Court Story
Euroleague & International Statistics

1948 births
1995 deaths
1967 FIBA World Championship players
1970 FIBA World Championship players
1974 FIBA World Championship players
1978 FIBA World Championship players
20th-century translators
AEK B.C. coaches
All-American college men's basketball players
Basketball players at the 1968 Summer Olympics
Basketball players at the 1972 Summer Olympics
Basketball players at the 1976 Summer Olympics
Basketball players at the 1980 Summer Olympics
Basketball players from Zagreb
Burials at Mirogoj Cemetery
BYU Cougars men's basketball players
Centers (basketball)
Competitors at the 1967 Mediterranean Games
Competitors at the 1971 Mediterranean Games
Converts to Mormonism
Croatian basketball coaches
Croatian men's basketball players
Croatian diplomats
Croatian Latter Day Saints
Croatian translators
Deaths from cancer in Maryland
Deaths from non-Hodgkin lymphoma
English–Croatian translators
European champions for Yugoslavia
FIBA EuroBasket-winning players
FIBA Hall of Fame inductees
FIBA World Championship-winning players
Franjo Bučar Award winners
KK Cibona players
KK Split coaches
KK Olimpija coaches
KK Olimpija players
KK Zadar coaches
KK Zadar players
Lega Basket Serie A players
Los Angeles Lakers draft picks
Medalists at the 1968 Summer Olympics
Medalists at the 1976 Summer Olympics
Medalists at the 1980 Summer Olympics
Mediterranean Games gold medalists for Yugoslavia
Mediterranean Games medalists in basketball
Naismith Memorial Basketball Hall of Fame inductees
National Collegiate Basketball Hall of Fame inductees
Olympic basketball players of Yugoslavia
Olympic gold medalists for Yugoslavia
Olympic medalists in basketball
Olympic silver medalists for Yugoslavia
Portland Trail Blazers draft picks
Translators of the Book of Mormon
Virtus Bologna coaches
Virtus Bologna players
Yugoslav basketball coaches
Yugoslav expatriates in the United States
Yugoslav men's basketball players